Manda is a village and an archaeological site in the Jammu district of the Union Territory of Jammu and Kashmir, India. It was excavated by Archaeological Survey of India during 1976-77 by J. P. Joshi. The site contains ruins of an ancient Indus Valley civilization.

Excavation
Excavation at Manda revealed a 9.20 m deposit with threefold sequence with two sub periods in Period I. Period II has early historical pottery of types comparable with those of same period from Northern part of India and period III is represented by Kushan antiquities and house walls with 3 m wide street. After the Kushan period, the site seems to have been deserted.

Historical significance
Manda is situated on the right bank of Chenab River in the foothills of Pir Panjal range, 28 km northwest of Jammu, and was considered the northernmost limit of the Harappan civilisation. It is considered the northmost site (excluding Shortugai) of Indus Valley civilisation.

It is considered a site established to procure wood from Himalayan Sub hills and send it downriver to other towns of the Indus Valley Civilisation.

Artefacts
Pre Harappan Red ware (15%-25%) Harappan Red ware, including jars, dishes, dishes-on-stand, beakers, goblets etc. and copper double spiral headed spin (having west Asian affinity), tangled bone arrow-heads, terracotta bangles, cakes, chert blade etc.

Significant finds include potsherds bearing incised Harappan Script and one unfinished seal.

Further scope
Due to the restricted nature of the dig undertaken, no specific structures could be exposed, except a collapsed rubble wall-like structure.

See also
 Indus Valley civilization
 List of Indus Valley Civilization sites
 Sutkagan Dor
 Alamgirpur
 Daimabad

References

External links
Map of Indus Valley Civilisation sites 

Archaeological sites in Jammu and Kashmir
Archaeological sites in India
Indus Valley civilisation sites
Villages in Jammu district